I Suppose may refer to:

 "I Suppose", a song by Puressence from their self-titled album
 "I Suppose", a song by Loudon Wainwright III from the album Grown Man
 "I Suppose" (Hip Hop artist), based out of Pacoima, California. Known for his deep and influential lyrics, I Suppose has been making a huge impact in the underground Hip Hop movement.